Greg Ottenbreit (born November 18, 1963) is a Canadian politician. He was elected to represent the electoral district of Yorkton in the Legislative Assembly of Saskatchewan in the 2007 election. He is a member of the Saskatchewan Party.

Before his election, Ottenbreit owned and operated Ottenbreit Waste Systems Limited along with his brother Grant.

On January 27, 2017, Ottenbreit revealed that he had been diagnosed with cancer.

Political Views

Abortion
In 2019 speech, Ottenbreit told an anti-abortion group to continue their "battle" and “I’ll continue to do what I can in my professional capacity," as the rural and remote health minister. Premier Scott Moe, who shares Ottenbreit's anti-abortion views, stated that the comments crossed a "small line" and that "We will choose our words more carefully." Ottenbreit had previously attended as an MLA the anti-abortion March for Life rallies in Ottawa and Regina in the past.

COVID-19 "Cure"
During the emerging COVID-19 pandemic, Ottenbreit drew criticism for sharing a tweet that people could "pray and repent" to cure their illness from the virus. Ottenbreit said in the tweet "I guess it worked a few thousand years ago ... couldn't hurt," but then later deleted the post.

First Nations People
In 2011, Ottenbreit argued against resource revenue-sharing with First Nations, suggesting that First Nations people who get "handouts" would spend it on drugs and alcohol. The comment drew calls for Ottenbreit's resignation from the Federation of Saskatchewan Indian Nations, who called the remarks “very hurtful and very inappropriate.”

Religion
In October 2020, Ottenbreit shared a Thanksgiving message from  Texas Pastor Ed Newton, an American preacher who has shared anti-LGBT views and whose church labels homosexuality as an addiction. Ottenbreit has shared messages from pastor John Hagee as well, another social conservative who had referred to the Roman Catholic Church as "the great whore", claimed Adolf Hitler was fulfilling God's will, promoted conspiratorial views about Jewish people, and  claimed Hurricane Katrina was God's punishment for gay rights. Ottenbreit said he was interested in Hagee's theory of "Blood Moons", which claims that lunar eclipses coinciding with Jewish holidays would trigger a war in Israel and usher in the return of Jesus Christ.

Cabinet positions

References

1963 births
Living people
Members of the Executive Council of Saskatchewan
People from Yorkton
Politicians from Regina, Saskatchewan
Saskatchewan Party MLAs
21st-century Canadian politicians